is a Quasi-National Park in the Koshikijima Islands of Satsumasendai, Kagoshima Prefecture, Japan.

See also

 List of national parks of Japan
 Parks and gardens in Kagoshima Prefecture

References

National parks of Japan
Parks and gardens in Kagoshima Prefecture
Protected areas established in 2015
2015 establishments in Japan